Belaya Kalitva is a town and the administrative center of Belokalitvinsky District in Rostov Oblast, Russia. Population:

History

It was founded in 1703.

Administrative and municipal status
Within the framework of administrative divisions, Belaya Kalitva serves as the administrative center of Belokalitvinsky District. As an administrative division, it is, together with three rural localities, incorporated within Belokalitvinsky District as Belokalitvinskoye Urban Settlement. As a municipal division, this administrative unit also has urban settlement status and is a part of Belokalitvinsky Municipal District.

References

Notes

Sources

External links
Official website of Belaya Kalitva 
Directory of organizations in Belaya Kalitva 

Cities and towns in Rostov Oblast
Populated places established in 1703
1703 establishments in Russia
Don Host Oblast